Kohti Yhdeksän Nousua (Finnish for "Towards the Rise of the Nine") is the first full-length studio album by the black metal band Horna. It was released on Solistitium Records in 1998 and was limited to 1500 copies. It was re-released on vinyl under Blut & Eisen Productions in December 2006, with modified artwork, 5 additional tracks recorded in 2000 and the title appended with (Sis. Ordo Regnum Sathanas). It was limited to 666 copies, with the first 100 of which being printed on grey and black vinyl. The cover bears resemblance to Darkthrone's A Blaze in the Northern Sky. The title is a reference to the nine Nazgûl from J. R. R. Tolkien's The Lord of the Rings.

Track listings

Original

Vinyl re-release
A side
"Örkkivuorilta"　(English: From the Goblin Mountains)
"Imperial Devastation"
"Sword of Darkness"
"White Aura Buried in Ashes"
"Korpin Hetki"　(English: Raven's Moment)
"Black Metal Sodomy"

B side
"Sormus Ja Silmä"　(English: Ring and Eye)
"Kun Lyömme Jumalan Kodin Liekkeihin"　(rough English: When We Set God's Home on Fire)
"Ihmisviha"　(English: Human Hatred)
"Ordo Regnum Sathanas"
"Distant Blazing Eye (outro)"

Personnel
Nazgul von Armageddon – vocals
Shatraug - guitar
Moredhel (Jyri Vahvanen) – guitar
Skratt – bass
Gorthaur – drums

Additional personnel
 Christophe Szpajdel - logo

Footnotes

External links
Official Horna site – Discography

Horna albums
1998 albums